Deportiva Venados is a football club that plays in the Liga Premier de México – Serie A. It is based in the city of Mérida, Mexico.

History
The team was founded in 2014 to recover the tradition of teams that had previously represented Mérida in Mexican soccer such as Atlético Yucatán and Venados de Yucatán, because the main team of the region had adopted the name of Mérida, although during its first season it was registered as a subsidiary team of Mérida F.C.

In 2015 the team officially adopted the name Deportiva Venados.

In the 2021–22 season the team was promoted to the Liga Premier de México – Serie A after defeating C.D. Avispones de Chilpancingo in the promotion playoff. Previously the team had eliminated the Álamos, Inter Playa del Carmen, Caballeros de Córdoba and Delfines UGM. However, the team failed to win the national championship as it was defeated in the final by Mazorqueros F.C.

Stadium
Deportiva Venados plays its home games at Estadio Alonso Diego Molina located in the town of Tamanché, belonging to the city of Mérida, Yucatán. It has a capacity to hold 2,500 spectators.

Players

First-team squad

Reserve teams
Deportiva Venados (Liga TDP)
Reserve team that plays in the Liga TDP, the fourth level of the Mexican league system.

References 

Association football clubs established in 2014
Football clubs in Yucatán
2014 establishments in Mexico
Mérida, Yucatán